Franz Michelberger (born 28 August 1955) is a German former professional footballer who played as a midfielder.

Honours
Bayern Munich
 European Cup: 1974–75, 1975–76
 Intercontinental Cup: 1976

References

External links
 
 

1955 births
Living people
People from Bad Saulgau
Sportspeople from Tübingen (region)
German footballers
Footballers from Baden-Württemberg
Association football midfielders
Bundesliga players
2. Bundesliga players
Ligue 1 players
Swiss Super League players
FC Bayern Munich footballers
BSV 07 Schwenningen players
Stade de Reims players
Kickers Offenbach players
SV Eintracht Trier 05 players
FC Wettingen players
FC Grenchen players
German expatriate footballers
German expatriate sportspeople in France
Expatriate footballers in France
German expatriate sportspeople in Switzerland
Expatriate footballers in Switzerland